Brežany is a village and municipality in Prešov District in the Prešov Region of eastern Slovakia.

History
In historical records the village was first mentioned in 1329.

Geography
It has a population of about 199 people (2020-12-31).

Genealogical resources

The records for genealogical research are available at the state archive "Statny Archiv in Presov, Slovakia"

 Roman Catholic church records (births/marriages/deaths): 1798-1897 (parish B)
 Greek Catholic church records (births/marriages/deaths): 1825-1898 (parish B)
 Lutheran church records (births/marriages/deaths): 1753-1895 (parish B)

See also
 List of municipalities and towns in Slovakia

References

External links
 
 
Surnames of living people in Brezany

Villages and municipalities in Prešov District
Šariš